Woodlawn Cemetery is a historic cemetery on Woodlawn Street in Clinton, Massachusetts. The oldest portion was laid out in 1853 by Joshua Thissell in the rural cemetery style popular at the time, and was one of the first municipal projects following the town's incorporation. It was expanded twice, in the 1890s and in the 1920s. Prominent burials include Erastus and Horatio Bigelow, the town's early leading businessmen.

The cemetery was listed on the National Register of Historic Places on July 23, 2013.

See also
 National Register of Historic Places listings in Worcester County, Massachusetts

References

External links
 

Cemeteries on the National Register of Historic Places in Massachusetts
Cemeteries in Worcester County, Massachusetts
Buildings and structures in Clinton, Massachusetts
National Register of Historic Places in Worcester County, Massachusetts
Rural cemeteries